M-Bus or Meter-Bus is a European standard (EN 13757-2 physical and link layer, EN 13757-3 application layer) for the remote reading of water, gas or electricity meters. M-Bus is also usable for other types of consumption meters, such as heating systems or water meters. The M-Bus interface is made for communication on two wires, making it cost-effective. A radio variant of M-Bus Wireless M-Bus is also specified in EN 13757–4.

The M-Bus was developed to fill the need for a system for the networking and remote reading of utility meters, for example to measure the consumption of gas or water in the home. This bus fulfills the special requirements of remotely powered or battery-driven systems, including consumer utility meters. When interrogated, the meters deliver the data they have collected to a common master, such as a hand-held computer, connected at periodic intervals to read all utility meters of a building. An alternative method of collecting data centrally is to transmit meter readings via a modem.

Other applications for the M-Bus such as alarm systems, flexible illumination installations, heating control, etc. are suitable.

Relation to the OSI model 
The concept was based on the ISO-OSI Reference Model, in order to realize an open system which could use almost any desired protocol.

Since the M-Bus is not a network, and therefore does not - among other things - need a transport or session layer, the levels four to six of the OSI model are empty. Therefore, only the physical, the data link, the network and the application layer are provided with functions.

Physical wire and connectors 
M-Bus connection is called P1, M-Bus or HAN (Home Area Network) consumer connection. M-Bus uses two-wire telephone cable with maximum length of 350 meters when using nominal transfer speeds 300 and 9600 baud. Lowering the speed up to 1000 meter cable can be used. There is no standardized connector, but RJ11 and RJ12 Modular connectors are used by meter manufacturers.

See also 

 Automatic meter reading
 Feed-in tariff
 Virtual power plant
 Net metering
 Smart meter
 Utility submeter
 Wattmeter
 OLE for process control
 OpenHAN

References 

 rSCADA libmbus An Open Source M-bus library written in C.
 jMBus M-Bus master Java library at openmuc.org.
 Valley.Net.Protocols.MeterBus An Open Source M-Bus library written in C#.

External links 
 m-bus.com
  the free scada project

Computer buses
EN standards